Puṇya (Sanskrit: पुण्य, 'merit') is a concept used in Buddhism and Hinduism, with several meanings.
 Punya (Hinduism)
 Merit (Buddhism)

It may also refer to:

 Punya, Falta, a village in South 24 Parganas district, West Bengal, India